Judicial disqualification, also referred to as recusal, is the act of abstaining from participation in an official action such as a legal proceeding due to a conflict of interest of the presiding court official or administrative officer. Applicable statutes or canons of ethics may provide standards for recusal in a given proceeding or matter. Providing that the judge or presiding officer must be free from disabling conflicts of interest makes the fairness of the proceedings less likely to be questioned.

Recusal in the United States 
In the United States, the term "recusal" is used most often with respect to court proceedings. Two sections of Title 28 of the United States Code (the Judicial Code) provide standards for judicial disqualification or recusal. Section 455, captioned "Disqualification of justice, judge, or magistrate judge", provides that a federal judge "shall disqualify himself in any proceeding in which his impartiality might reasonably be questioned". The section also provides that a judge is disqualified "where he has a personal bias or prejudice concerning a party, or personal knowledge of disputed evidentiary facts concerning the proceeding"; when the judge has previously served as a lawyer or witness concerning the same case or has expressed an opinions concerning its outcome; or when the judge or a member of his or her immediate family has a financial interest in the outcome of the proceeding.

28 U.S.C. Section 144, captioned "Bias or prejudice of judge", provides that under circumstances, when a party to a case in a United States District Court files a "timely and sufficient motion that the judge before whom the matter is pending has a personal bias or prejudice either against him or in favor of an adverse party", the case shall be transferred to another judge.

The general rule is that, to warrant recusal, a judge's expression of an opinion about the merits of a case, or his familiarity with the facts or the parties, must have originated in a source outside the case itself. This is referred to in the United States as the "extra-judicial source rule" and was recognized as a general presumption, although not an invariable one, in the 1994 U.S. Supreme Court decision in Liteky v. United States.

At times justices or judges will recuse themselves sua sponte (on their own motion), recognizing that facts leading to their disqualification are present. However, where such facts exist, a party to the case may suggest recusal. Generally, each judge is the arbiter of a motion for the judge's recusal, which is addressed to the judge's conscience and discretion. However, where lower courts are concerned, an erroneous refusal to recuse in a clear case can be reviewed on appeal or, under extreme circumstances, by a petition for a writ of prohibition.

In certain special situations, circumstances that would otherwise call for recusal of a judge or group of judges may be disregarded, when otherwise no judge would be available to hear the case. For example, if a case concerns a salary increase payable to a judge, that judge would ordinarily be disqualified from hearing the case. However, if the pay increase is applicable to all of the judges in the court system, the judge will keep the case, because the grounds for recusal would be equally applicable to any other judge. The principle that a judge will not be disqualified when the effect would be that no judge could hear the case is sometimes referred to as the "rule of necessity".

Relevant incidents in the US 
On Sep 28th 2021, the Wall Street Journals investigative team found that 131 judges did not recuse themselves in cases where they had a financial interest through ownership of stocks in the relevant parties. 2/3 of cases ended with a verdict favorable to the party in which the judge owned stock. Explanations given for the lapse included: unknown ownership via brokers investing on behalf of judge, unaware of the laws regarding proper disclosure and recusal, spelling errors and ownership of subsidiaries (e.g. Exxon Corp. vs Exxon Oil which is a subsidiary), ownership of stocks held not by the judge but by close family members (spouses, children, etc), and finally insistence that stock ownership did not influence their decisions especially if the outcome did not change stock price. All of these explanations are still a violation of federal law.

Supreme Court cases 
In the Supreme Court of the United States, the Justices typically recuse themselves from participating in cases in which they have financial interests. For example, Justice Sandra Day O'Connor generally did not participate in cases involving telecommunications firms because she owned stock in these firms, and Justice Stephen Breyer has disqualified himself in some cases involving insurance companies because of his participation in a Lloyd's of London syndicate. Justices also have declined to participate in cases in which close relatives, such as their children, are lawyers for one of the parties. Even if the family member is connected to one of the parties but is not directly involved in the case, justices may recuse themselves – for instance Clarence Thomas recused himself in United States v. Virginia because his son was attending Virginia Military Institute, whose policies were the subject of the case. On occasion, recusal occurs under more unusual circumstances; for example, in two cases, Chief Justice William H. Rehnquist stepped down from the bench when cases were argued by Arizona attorney James Brosnahan, who had testified against Rehnquist at his confirmation hearing in 1986. Whatever the reason for recusal, the United States Reports will record that the named justice "took no part in the consideration or decision of this case".

A notable case was the 2001 death penalty appeal by Napoleon Beazley, convicted of a 1994 murder, in which a full three justices recused themselves due to personal ties to the victim's son, federal appeals court judge J. Michael Luttig. Luttig had previously clerked for Justice Scalia, and had led the confirmation efforts on behalf of both David Souter and Clarence Thomas. The death sentence was upheld all the same.

Historically, standards for recusal in the Supreme Court and lower courts were less rigorous than they have become in more recent years. In the 1803 case of Marbury v. Madison, Chief Justice John Marshall participated in the decision and authored the opinion of the Court even though Marshall's actions as Secretary of State two years prior could be seen as the subject of the proceeding. On the other hand, Marshall did recuse himself in both the 1813 and 1816 hearings of Martin v. Hunter's Lessee, despite its equally significant constitutional implications, as he and his brother had contracted with Martin to buy the land in dispute. Moreover, during the 19th century, the U.S. federal court system was structured so that an appeal from a judge's decision was often heard by an appellate panel containing the same judge, who was expected to sit in impartial review of his own earlier ruling. This situation is no longer permissible, and 28 U.S.C. § 47 provides that "No judge shall hear or determine an appeal from the decision of a case or issue tried by him."

A notable dispute over recusal in U.S. Supreme Court history took place in 1946, when Justice Hugo Black participated in deciding the Jewell Ridge Coal case, although a former law partner of Black argued for the prevailing side. The losing party in the 5–4 decision sought reargument on the ground that Black should have been disqualified; Black declined to recuse himself and the decision stood, but Justice Robert H. Jackson wrote a short opinion suggesting that the decision that Black should sit in the case was Black's alone and the Court did not endorse it. The dispute aggravated infighting between Black and Jackson, and it has been suggested that this was one of the reasons that, when Chief Justice Harlan Fiske Stone died, President Harry S. Truman appointed Fred M. Vinson to succeed Stone rather than promote a sitting Associate Justice to Chief Justice.

In 1973, then-Associate Justice Rehnquist wrote a lengthy in-chambers opinion declining to recuse himself in Laird v. Tatum, a case challenging the validity of certain arrests, even though Rehnquist had previously served as a White House lawyer and opined that the arrest program was valid. In 2004, Justice Antonin Scalia wrote an opinion declining to recuse himself in a case to which Vice President Dick Cheney was a party in his official capacity, despite the contention of several environmental groups that Scalia's participation created an appearance of impropriety because Scalia had recently participated in a widely publicized hunting trip with the Vice President. The same year, however, Scalia recused himself without explanation in Elk Grove Unified School District v. Newdow, a First Amendment case challenging inclusion of the words "under God" in the Pledge of Allegiance, after giving a public speech in which Scalia stated his view that Newdow's claims were meritless.

Other federal cases 
In 1974, federal judge Leon Higginbotham issued his decision in Comm. of Pa. v. Local 542, Int'l Union of Operating Engineers, explaining why he as an African American judge with a history of active involvement in the civil rights struggle was not obligated to recuse himself from presiding over litigation concerning claims of racial discrimination. He held, in an opinion that was followed by later judges, including a series of black judges who faced recusal requests, that a judge should not be forced to recuse solely because of their membership in a minority group. Jewish federal Judge Paul Borman relied on the Higginbotham opinion in part in his 2014 decision not to recuse himself from the trial of Palestinian-American Rasmea Odeh. Similarly, in 1994, Jewish then-federal-Judge Michael Mukasey refused to recuse himself in a case concerning the 1993 World Trade Center bombing, warning that his recusal would "disqualify not only an obscure district judge such as the author of this opinion, but also Justices Brandeis and Frankfurter ... each having been both a Jew and a Zionist".

Administrative agency and other matters 
Outside the judicial system, the concept of recusal is also applied in administrative agencies. When a member of a multi-member administrative body is recused, the remaining members typically determine the outcome. When the sole occupant of an official position is recused, the matter may be delegated to the official's deputy or to a temporarily designated official; for example, when the Solicitor General of the United States is recused from a case, the Deputy Solicitor General will handle the matter in his or her place. On March 2, 2017, Jeff Sessions, Attorney General of the U.S., recused himself while the department investigated Russian interference in the 2016 election due to concerns over his impartiality as a member of the Trump campaign team.

Concepts analogous to recusal also exist in the legislative branch. Members with a personal financial interest in a measure should not vote according to the rules of the United States Senate and House of Representatives. In such cases, the Senator or Representative may record a vote of "present" rather than "yea" or "nay".

Applicable to most countries 
Laws or court rules provide the recusal of judges. Although the details vary, the following are nearly universal grounds for recusal.

 The judge is related to a party, attorney, or spouse of either party (usually) within three degrees of kinship.
 The judge is a party.
 The judge is a material witness unless pleading purporting to make the Judge a party is false (determined by presiding judge, but see substitution).
 The judge has previously acted in the case in question as an attorney for a party, or participated in some other capacity.
 The judge prepared any legal instrument (such as a contract or will) whose validity or construction is at issue.
 Appellate judge previously handled case as a trial judge or at a lower appellate level.
 The judge has personal or financial interest in the outcome. This particular ground varies by jurisdiction. Some require recusal if there is any interest at all in the outcome, while others only require recusal if there is interest beyond a certain value.
 The judge determines he or she cannot act impartially.

Responsibility and consequences 
A judge who has grounds to recuse themself is expected to do so. If a judge does not know that grounds exist to recuse themselves the error is harmless. If a judge does not recuse themselves when they should have known to do so, they may be subject to sanctions, which vary by jurisdiction. Depending on the jurisdiction, if an appellate court finds a judgment to have been made when the judge in question should have been recused, it may set aside the judgment and return the case for retrial.

Waiver and substitution 
The recusal rule may be avoided or ignored if all parties and the judge agree, although in practice this rarely occurs. If recusal is avoided in this manner, a full and complete record of the facts that qualify as grounds, above, must be made for the appellate court.

If a judge fails to recuse themselves sua sponte and a party believes the judge has a bias the party may motion for substitution. In some jurisdictions litigants may have the right to substitute a judge, even if no bias is demonstrated.

See also 
Civil rights
R v Sussex Justices, ex parte McCarthy
R v Bow Street Metropolitan Stipendiary Magistrate, ex parte Pinochet
Substitution (law)
 Nemo iudex in causa sua

References 

 Wis. Stat. sec. 757.19(2)
 Wis. SCR 60.04(4)
 State v. Asfoor, 75 Wis.2d 411, 436 (1977).

Further reading

External links 
 Decision of Judge Ware denying motion for recusal in Perry v. Schwarzenegger
 Quebec Court of Appeal decision denying motion for recusal (C.C. c. G.C., 2013 QCCA 239 (CanLII)) 
 AJH Lawyers Pty Ltd v Careri and Others (2013) 34 VR 236
 Due Process and Judicial Disqualification: The Need for Reform, Gabriel D. Serbulea, 2011, Pepperdine Law Review, has an appendix including statutes and precedents in all 50 of the United States.

Legal ethics
Legal procedure
Conflict of interest
Conflict of interest mitigation